José Ramón Pelier Córdova (born 7 February 2001) is a Cuban sprint canoeist who competed in the Men's Canoe Single 1000m event at the 2020 Summer Olympics.

He won a gold medal in the C1 1000m event during stage two of the 2021 Canoe Sprint World Cup in Russia.

Career highlights

References

External links
 José Ramón Pelier at Eurosport
 

2001 births
Living people
Cuban male canoeists
Olympic canoeists of Cuba
Canoeists at the 2020 Summer Olympics
21st-century Cuban people